"Por Amar a Ciegas" ("For Loving Blind") is the first single by the reggaeton singer Arcángel from his first compilation album El Fenómeno, released in December 2008. It was produced by Luny Tunes, Tainy and Noriega.

Versions and remixes
"Por Amar a Ciegas" (Original) – 
"Por Amar a Ciegas" (Remix) – 
"Por Amar a Ciegas" (Bachata version) – 
"Por Amar a Ciegas" (Hip-Hop version) –

Music video
In the music video, Luny from the production duo makes a cameo appearance.

Charts

References

External links
 "Por Amar a Ciegas" official music video

2008 singles
Arcángel (singer) songs
Reggaeton songs
American hip hop songs
Bachata songs
Songs written by Noriega (producer)
Song recordings produced by Luny Tunes
2008 songs